Gustaf Johan Lagerbielke (born 10 April 2000) is a Swedish footballer who plays as a defender for Allsvenskan side IF Elfsborg.

Career 
Lagerbielke made his full international debut for Sweden on 12 January 2023 in a friendly 2–1 win against Iceland.

Career statistics

International

References

External links 
 

2000 births
Living people
Swedish footballers
Sollentuna FK players
Västerås SK Fotboll players
IF Elfsborg players
Degerfors IF players
Ettan Fotboll players
Superettan players
Allsvenskan players
Association football defenders